Celena Mondie-Milner (born August 6, 1968) is a retired American sprinter who specialized in the 100 and 200 metres.

She competed in both 200 metres at the 1991 World Indoor Championships, and 100 and 200 metres at the 1995 World Championships, without reaching the final. Her foremost achievement was a gold medal in the 4 × 400 metres relay at the 1995 World Championships.

Her personal best times were 11.17 seconds in the 100 metres, achieved in June 1996 in Atlanta; 22.55 seconds in the 200 metres, achieved in June 1996 in Atlanta; and 51.14 seconds in the 400 metres, achieved in June 1989 in Provo.

References

1968 births
Living people
American female sprinters
World Athletics Championships medalists
Universiade medalists in athletics (track and field)
Universiade gold medalists for the United States
World Athletics Championships winners
Medalists at the 1989 Summer Universiade
21st-century American women